Julolaelaps is a genus of mites in the family Laelapidae.

Species
 Julolaelaps buensis Maes, 1983
 Julolaelaps cameroonensis Maes, 1983
 Julolaelaps dispar Berlese, 1916
 Julolaelaps excavatus Fain, 1987
 Julolaelaps idjwiensis Fain, 1987
 Julolaelaps madiakokoensis Fain, 1987
 Julolaelaps moseri Hunter & Rosario, 1986
 Julolaelaps paucipilis Fain, 1987
 Julolaelaps serratus Maes, 1983
 Julolaelaps vandaelensis Maes, 1983

References

Laelapidae